= Maranathirkku Pinbu Helan =

Maranthirkku Pinbu Helan
- Directed by: Sivakumar
- Produced by: Silver Touch India
- Starring: Vijay Annis, Kamali, Nagina
- Cinematography: Devaraj
- Edited by: Maari
- Music by: Thomas Rathnam
- Release date: 2018
- Running time: 130 minutes
- Country: India
- Languages: Tamil, Malayalam

Maranthirkku Pinbu Helan is a 2018 Tamil drama film starring Vijay Annis, Kamali, Nagina and Kalam Arunachalam. It is a block-buster Horror movie, Directed by Sivakumar and Music Directed by Isai Aruvi Thomas Rathnam.

== Plot ==
The story begins with a young lovers. Due to the social bitterness the young lovers desperate and commit suicide. Heroine become a spirit and looks revenge. It's a heart throbbing love with sentiments and comedy subject.

== Cast ==
- Vijay Annis as Hero
- Kamali as Heroine
- Kalam Arunachalam as Comedian

== Production ==
Silver Touch India Produced this film

== Release ==
This film is shot in dual language as Tamil and Malayalam. Dubbed in Telugu.

== Soundtrack ==
Maranathirkku Pinbu Helan

Soundtrack album by Thomas Rathnam
- Released: 2018
- Language: Tamil

The soundtrack was composed by "Isai Aruvi Thomas Rathnam "while the lyrics for all the songs were written by Arrupukottai Thavasimani, Bharathan, Madumathi, Vaanam and Thomas Rathnam.

No.	Title	Lyrics	Singers	Length
1.	"Megam Thottu"	Aruppukottai Thavasimani	Dr.Vincent Therraisnathan
2.	"En Anbae Aaruyirae"	Thomas Rathnam
3.	"Kadal Vanthathu"	Kavingar Senthamizh	Deepika, Dr.Vincent Therraisnathan
4.	"En Anbae"	Thomas Rathnam	Dr.Vincent Therraisnathan, J.Kevin Jason
